Kunming Airlines is a Chinese airline based in Kunming, Yunnan province, and established in 2005.

History
In December 2005 the Civil Aviation Administration of China (CAAC) said it would soon approve operation of the private airline Kunming Airlines, which has a registered capital of RMB80 million, and plans to be based at Kunming Wujiaba International Airport.

As of January 2009, Kunming Airlines is 80 percent owned by Shenzhen Airlines with the remaining 20% owned by a local businessman, with a total registered capital of RMB 80 million. The new airline will receive two B737-700 and one B737-800 aircraft as well as 30 pilots and 26 flight attendants from Shenzhen Airlines.

The airline commenced operations on 15 February 2009 from Kunming to Changsha and Harbin.

Routes

Kunming Airlines, based in Kunming Changshui International Airport, will operate flights within Yunnan province as well as routes connecting Kunming and other cities, and gradually launch flights between Kunming and ASEAN (Association of Southeast Asian Nations) countries.

Fleet

, Kunming Airlines operates an all-Boeing fleet consisting of the following aircraft:

In 2014 Kunming Airlines agreed to purchase 10 Boeing 737 aircraft (4 Boeing 737-700 Next Gen and 6 Boeing 737 MAX) in an $897m deal.

References

Airlines of China
Airlines established in 2005
Companies based in Kunming
Chinese brands
Air China
Chinese companies established in 2005